Gladys Chesir Kiptagelai (born 20 February 1993) is a Kenyan long-distance runner who competes over distances from 3000 metres up to the marathon. She was a gold medallist at the Youth Olympics and a silver medallist at the African Games in 2015.

Career
Chesir won her first international medal at the 2010 Summer Youth Olympics, where she topped the podium in the 3000 m. This was Kenya's first ever medal at the new competition. She began to make her mark as a senior around late 2014 in road running events, having top three finishes at the Zevenheuvelenloop, Egmond Half Marathon and World 10K Bangalore. She set a personal best in the half marathon in Yangzhou, running a time of 1:09:17. After a third place finish at the Kenyan Athletics Championships, she was chosen for the 10,000 metres at the 2015 African Games and ultaimtely won a silver medal on her senior international debut, behind compatriot Alice Aprot Nawowuna. Her ability was further proved with a win at the Grand 10 Berlin, where she moved up to ninth on the all-time 10K run lists with a time of 30:41.

Chesir continued to improve with a time of 68:36 for third at the Delhi Half Marathon, then 66:57 for fifth at the RAK Half Marathon. This led to her selection for the 2016 IAAF World Half Marathon Championships, where she was sixth in a time of 68:46, but outside of the team rankings behind compatriots Peres Jechirchir, Cynthia Jerotich, and Mary Wacera Ngugi, who swept the top three positions. She placed third in the 10,000m at the 2016 Athletics Kenya Olympic Trials, but did not get added to the Kenyan team as she had not achieved the required qualification time. She continued on the roads, with top five finishes in Delhi, Copenhagen, and Prague before winning the Lille Half Marathon with her second fastest ever time at that point with 67:49.

Chesir had her marathon debut in October 2017, and gave a strong performance with 2:24:51 for the runner-up spot at the top level marathon behind Ethiopian Tadelech Bekele.

International competitions

Personal bests
1500 metres – 4:28.1 (2014)
3000 metres – 8:52.63 (2014)
5000 metres – 15:19.93 (2014)
10,000 metres – 31:36.87 (2015)
10K run – 30:41 (2015)
Half marathon – 66:57 (2016)
Marathon – 2:24:51 (2017)

See also
List of 2010 Summer Youth Olympics medal winners

References

External links

Living people
1993 births
Kenyan female long-distance runners
Kenyan female marathon runners
Athletes (track and field) at the 2010 Summer Youth Olympics
African Games silver medalists for Kenya
African Games medalists in athletics (track and field)
Athletes (track and field) at the 2015 African Games
Youth Olympic gold medalists for Kenya
Youth Olympic gold medalists in athletics (track and field)